

Aeromere was an Italian aircraft manufacturing firm established at Trento in 1957 to build Aviamilano Super Falco aircraft for the US market, and the Aeromere M-100 sailplane for Italy's gliding clubs. In 1964 it was purchased by the Laverda group.

References
 Gunston, Bill. (1993). World Encyclopaedia of Aircraft Manufacturers. Naval Institute Press: Annapolis, Maryland. pp. 14 & 178.

Defunct aircraft manufacturers of Italy
Caproni